Cedar Grove, near Brownsville, Tennessee, also known as Holloway-Morey House is a one-and-a-half-story cottage which was built in c.1850.  It was listed on the National Register of Historic Places in 1980, and was delisted in 2018.

It has Greek Revival architecture, specifically its one-story pedimented portico with four square Tuscan columns, and its door with head and side lights (windows).

Yellow poplar wood was used in its mortise-and-tenon frame construction, in its weatherboard siding, and in its wide plank floors.

At its NRHP listing in 1980 it was on a  property;  it was once the center of a  plantation.

References

National Register of Historic Places in Tennessee
Greek Revival architecture in Tennessee
Buildings and structures completed in 1850
Houses in Haywood County, Tennessee
Former National Register of Historic Places in Tennessee